Wauka Mountain is a summit in the U.S. state of Georgia.

A variant name is "Walker Mountain". The summit derives its name from Richard Walker, a pioneer citizen.

References

Mountains of Hall County, Georgia
Mountains of White County, Georgia
Mountains of Georgia (U.S. state)